WCJM-FM (100.9 FM) is a radio station licensed to serve West Point, Georgia, United States.  The station is owned by San Antonio–based iHeartMedia, through licensee iHM Licenses, LLC.

It broadcasts a country music format and features programming from Westwood One.

History
In August 1998, Fuller Broadcasting Company, Inc., reached an agreement to sell this station to Root Communications License Company, L.P., as part of a five-station deal.

In March 2003, Root Communications License Company, L.P., reached an agreement to sell this station to Qantum Communications subsidiary Qantum of Auburn License Company, LLC, as part of a 26 station deal valued at $82.2 million.  The deal was approved by the FCC on April 30, 2003, and the transaction was consummated on July 2, 2003.

On May 15, 2014, Qantum Communications announced that it would sell its 29 stations, including WCJM-FM, to Clear Channel Communications (now iHeartMedia), in a transaction connected to Clear Channel's sale of WALK AM-FM in Patchogue, New York, to Connoisseur Media via Qantum. The transaction was consummated on September 9, 2014.

References

External links

CJM-FM
Country radio stations in the United States
Radio stations established in 2003
IHeartMedia radio stations